Pentachlaena betamponensis is a tree in the family Sarcolaenaceae. It is endemic to Madagascar. It is named for the Betampona Reserve where the species is found.

Description
Pentachlaena betamponensis grows as a tree of unknown height. Its coriaceous leaves are obovate in shape and coloured brown above and greenish brown below. The inflorescences bear up to 10 flowers, each with five sepals and five petals. Fruits are unknown.

Distribution and habitat
Pentachlaena betamponensis is known only from the eastern region of Atsinanana where it is found in the Betampona Reserve. Its habitat is humid forest from sea-level to about  altitude.

References

Sarcolaenaceae
Endemic flora of Madagascar
Trees of Madagascar
Plants described in 2000